The Bernard Price Memorial Lecture is the premier annual lecture of the South African Institute of Electrical Engineers. It is of general scientific or engineering interest and is given by an invited guest, often from overseas, at several of the major centres on South Africa. The main lecture and accompanying dinner are usually held at the University of Witwatersrand and it is also presented in the space of one week at other centres, typically Cape Town, Durban, East London and Port Elizabeth.

The Lecture is named in memory of the eminent electrical engineer Bernard Price. The first Lecture was held in 1951 and it has occurred as an annual event ever since.

Lecturers

1951	Basil Schonland
1952	A M Jacobs
1953	H J Van Eck
1954	J M Meek
1955	Frank Nabarro
1956	A L Hales
1957	P G Game
1958	Colin Cherry
1959	Thomas Allibone
1960	M G Say
1961	Willis Jackson
1963	W R Stevens
1964	William Pickering
1965	G H Rawcliffe
1966	Harold Bishop
1967	Eric Eastwood
1968	F J Lane
1969	A H Reeves
1970 	Andrew R Cooper
1971 	Herbert Haslegrave
1972 	W J Bray
1973 	R Noser
1974 	D Kind
1975 	L Kirchmayer
1976 	S Jones
1977 	J Johnson
1978 	T G E Cockbain
1979 	A R Hileman
1980 	James Redmond
1981 	L M Muntzing
1982 	K F Raby
1983 	R Isermann
1984 	M N John
1985 	J W L de Villiers
1986 	Derek Roberts
1987	Wolfram Boeck
1988	Karl Gehring
1989 	Leonard Sagan
1990 	GKF Heyner
1991 	P S Blythin
1992 	P M Neches
1993 	P Radley
1994 	P R Rosen
1995 	F P Sioshansi
1996 	J Taylor
1997 	M Chamia
1998	C Gellings
1999	M W Kennedy
2000	John Midwinter
2001	Pragasen Pillay
2002 	Polina Bayvel
2003	Case Rijsdijk
2004	Frank Larkins
2005    Igor Aleksander
2006    Kevin Warwick
2007     Skip Hatfield
2008     Sami Solanki
2009     William Gruver
2010     Glenn Ricart
2011     Philippe Paelinck
2012     Nick Frydas
2013     Vint Cerf
2014     Ian Jandrell
2015     Saurabh Sinha
2016      Tshilidzi Marwala
2017      Fulufhelo Nelwamondo 
2018      Ian Craig 
2019      Robert Metcalfe
2020      Roger Price 
2021 Saifur Rahman
2022 Stuart J. Russell

See also

 List of engineering awards

References 

Awards established in 1951
Price, Bernard
Electrical engineering awards